15 Arietis (abbreviated 15 Ari) is a single variable star in the northern constellation of Aries. 15 Arietis is the Flamsteed designation; it also bears the variable star designation AV Arietis. It has an apparent visual magnitude of 5.74, which is just bright enough to be visible to the naked eye from dark suburban skies. At that distance, the star's brightness is reduced by 0.33 in magnitude because of extinction from interstellar gas and dust.

This is a red giant star with a stellar classification of M3 III. At the estimated distance of Delta Ophiuchi, this yields a physical size of about 67 times the radius of the Sun.

15 Arietis is a short period semiregular variable with the designation AV Arietis.  The period given in the General Catalogue of Variable Stars is 5.032 days.  Longterm photometry finds that the strongest pulsation period is 18.1 days with an amplitude of 0.028 magnitudes, while a second is 21.9 days and 0.030 in magnitude.

References

External links
 HR 631
 Image 15 Arietis

013325
010155
Arietis, 15
Aries (constellation)
M-type giants
Arietis, AV
0631
Short period semiregular variable
Durchmusterung objects